Maitê Proença Gallo (born 28 January 1958) is a Brazilian actress, television presenter and writer.

Biography 
Maitê Proença was born in São Paulo, Brazil. Her mother was Margot Proença, a philosophy and music teacher who died when Maitê was 12, killed by her father. Her father was Eduardo Gallo (died in 1989). She has a younger brother, René Augusto Proença Gallo, born in 1963. She is of Portuguese descent; both of her grandfathers were Portuguese.

As a child, Proença studied in an American school and spoke fluent English, as well as French, Spanish, and Italian. She attended the undergraduate psychology programme at the Pontifícia Universidade Católica de São Paulo and the University of São Paulo, where she studied journalism. Proença also attended a number of courses at the Sorbonne at the end of the 1970s, while living in France. Between 1977 and 1979 she traveled around the world to Europe, Asia, and Africa. She has maintained this habit, traveling to more than 70 countries.

In 1979, Proença had a serious car accident. She underwent two surgical operations and was bedridden for almost a year.

Career 
Proença has worked on Brazilian telenovelas, films and plays. Her role in the telenovela Dona Beija was her first major TV success in Brazil, Portugal and some 50 other countries where it was shown.

Proença has written two books. Her first book, Entre ossos e a escrita, published in 2005, contained the best of her essays. The second book, Uma Vida Inventada, sold 100,000 copies in Brazil and was exported to Portugal. She has also written two plays one of which, As Meninas, won her several prizes. She has a column in the Brazilian magazine Época.

Proença has been a TV host for Video Show (1983), Programa de Domingo (1987) and Saia Justa (2006/2007). In 2006, Proença wrote her first theater play, Achadas e Perdidas. In 2002, she made her debut as a theater producer with the play Buda.

In 2009, due to controversial remarks on the Brazilian TV show Saia Justa, Proença prompted public outrage in Portugal and was accused of being Lusophobic, though she has since affirmed numerous times her love for Portugal. She has since denied the accusation and recorded several apologies, as well as issuing one on her official blog. Proença emphasized that despite the misunderstanding, she is of recent Portuguese ancestry and likes Portugal and the Portuguese. For about a week, the affair was discussed or reported on several Portuguese television networks and major newspapers.

Personal life 
Proença released a book in 2008 entitled "An Invented Life", which reveals that at age 16, living in Paris, she had her first boyfriend, a Frenchman who was a few years older. Through carelessness, she became pregnant by him. After several fights, and various comings and goings, he decided that he would not support her, and abandoned her, pregnant. Without the emotional means to have a child, she went to a clinic in the area where she had an abortion and a quiet recovery. She revealed in interviews that she was sure of what she was doing at the time, not regretting the act, stating that women need to have the freedom to deal with their lives, with their own bodies. Over time, she had several boyfriends.

In 1982, having lived back in Brazil for a few years, Proença decided to live with her fiancé, Paulo Marinho, Odile Rubirosa's ex-husband, with whom she lived for 12 years and had her only daughter, Maria, born in October 1990. In 1995, she had a brief affair with cast member Victor Fasano. From 1996 to 2000 she lived with her boyfriend, Edgar Moura. From 2004 to 2007, she had a relationship with press officer Rodrigo Paiva.
Later she briefly dated the Carioca entrepreneur Toninho Dias Leite and the Portuguese writer Miguel Sousa Tavares, as well as the businessman Alexandre Colombo, with whom she was with for two years, ending in 2011.

In spite of her relationship with Edgar Moura, with whom she lived for 4 years, and with Paulo Marinho, with whom she lived for 12 years, where on her personal website Paulo is described as "husband", Proença was never officially married with either one of them, to avoid losing the pension paid by SPPREV - São Paulo Previdência, which according to data from 2013, published by Época at the time was disclosed as being about R$13,000. Proença had been receiving this since 1989, the year of her father's death by suicide; her father was a prosecutor. In 2008 the value reached R$21,500. This pension is the result of complementary law 180/1978, which provides: "The pension attributed to the incapable or invalid shall be due for the duration of incapacity or invalidity and the unmarried daughter until marriage." According to the report, to keep the pension, it is common practice for many women to hold a religious marriage, live with a husband and even have children, but not officially register the relationship.

In November 2021, Maitê announced relationship with Adriana Calcanhotto.

Filmography

Television

Internet

Films

Theater

References

External links

 Maitê Proença - official blog
 www.maite.com.br - official web site

1959 births
Living people
Actresses from São Paulo
Brazilian people of Portuguese descent
Brazilian telenovela actresses
Brazilian stage actresses
Brazilian film actresses
Brazilian voice actresses
Brazilian women writers
20th-century Brazilian actresses
21st-century Brazilian actresses
21st-century LGBT people
LGBT actresses
Brazilian LGBT writers
Brazilian LGBT actors